{{Infobox ethnic group
| group            = Thai Chinese
| native_name      =  or 
| image            = 
| caption          = Wat Mangkon Kamalawat, a Chinese Buddhist temple in Thailand
| pop              =  7-10 million
| popplace         =  ThailandBangkok, Phuket, Chonburi, Chiang Mai, Chachoengsao, Surat Thani, Hatyai and Yala  Significant diaspora in: ''''
| langs            = Central Thai, Mandarin, Hokkien, Cantonese, Teochew, Hakka, Hainanese, Hockchew, Henghua
| rels             = PredominantlyTheravada BuddhismMinoritiesAgnostic, Chinese folk religion, Mahayana Buddhism, Christianity, Chinese Buddhism
| related          = ThaisPeranakansOverseas Chinese Han Chinese
}}Thai Chinese (also known as Chinese Thais, Sino-Thais), Thais of Chinese origin' (exonym and also domestically) are Chinese descendants in Thailand. Thai Chinese are the largest minority group in the country and the largest overseas Chinese community in the world with a population of approximately 7-10 million people, accounting for 11–14% of the total population of the country as of 2012. It is also the oldest and most prominently integrated overseas Chinese community, with a history dating back to the 1100s. Slightly more than half of the ethnic Chinese population in Thailand trace their ancestry to Chaoshan. This is evidenced by the prevalence of the Teochew dialect among the Chinese community in Thailand as well as other Chinese languages.The term as commonly understood signifies those whose ancestors immigrated to Thailand before 1949.

The Thai Chinese have been deeply ingrained into all elements of Thai society over the past 200 years. The present Thai royal family, the Chakri dynasty, was founded by King Rama I who himself was partly Chinese. His predecessor, King Taksin of the Thonburi Kingdom, was the son of a Chinese father from Chaoshan. With the successful integration of historic Chinese immigrant communities in Thailand, a significant number of Thai Chinese are the descendants of intermarriages between ethnic Chinese and native Thais. Many of these descendants have assimilated into Thai society and self-identify solely as Thai.

Thai Chinese are a well-established middle class ethnic group and are well represented at all levels of Thai society. They play a leading role in Thailand's business sector and dominate the Thai economy today. In addition, Thai Chinese elites of Thailand have a strong presence in Thailand's political scene with most of Thailand's former Prime Ministers and the majority of parliament having at least some Chinese ancestry. Thai Chinese elites of Thailand are well represented among Thailand's rulers and other sectors.

Demographics
Thailand has the largest overseas Chinese community in the world outside Greater China. 11 to 14 percent of Thailand's population are considered ethnic Chinese. The Thai linguist Theraphan Luangthongkum claims the share of those having at least partial Chinese ancestry allegedly at about 40 percent of the Thai population without any proof.

Identity
For assimilated second and third generation descendants of Chinese immigrants, it is principally a personal choice whether or not to identify themselves as ethnic Chinese. Nonetheless, nearly all Thai Chinese solely self-identify as Thai, due to their close integration and successful assimilation into Thai society. G. William Skinner observed that the level of assimilation of the descendants of Chinese immigrants in Thailand disproved the "myth about the 'unchanging Chinese'", noting that "assimilation is considered complete when the immigrant's descendant identifies himself in almost all social situations as a Thai, speaks Thai language habitually and with native fluency, and interacts by choice with Thai more often than with Chinese." Skinner believed that the assimilation success of the Thai Chinese was a result of the wise policy of the Thai rulers who, since the 17th century, allowed able Chinese tradesmen to advance their ranks into the kingdom's nobility. The rapid and successful assimilation of the Thai Chinese has been celebrated by the Chinese descendants themselves, as evident in contemporary literature such as the novel Letters from Thailand by Botan.

Today, the Thai Chinese constitute a significant part of the royalist/nationalist movements. When the then prime minister Thaksin Shinawatra, who is Thai Chinese, was ousted from power in 2006, it was Sondhi Limthongkul, another prominent Thai Chinese businessman, who formed and led People's Alliance for Democracy (PAD) movement to protest the successive governments run by Thaksin's allies. Mr. Sondhi accused Mr. Thaksin of corruption based on improper business ties between Thaksin's corporate empire and the Singapore-based Temasek Holdings Group. The Thai Chinese in and around Bangkok were also the main participants of the months-long political campaign against the government of Ms. Yingluck (Mr. Thaksin's sister), between November 2013 and May 2014, the event which culminated in the military takeover in May 2014.

 History 
Traders from China began arriving in Ayutthaya by at least the 12th century. In the 1420s, Chinese merchants were involved in the construction of the major Ayutthaya temple Wat Ratchaburana and left several Chinese inscriptions and cultural objects within the temple's crypt, including the inscribing of several Chinese family names. According to the Chronicles of Ayutthaya, Ekathotsarot (r. 1605–1610) had been "concerned solely with ways of enriching his treasury," and was "greatly inclined toward strangers and foreign nations". 

Following the Qing revocation of the private trade ban in 1684, Chinese immigration to Siam steadily increased, particularly following the massive Southern Chinese famines of the early 18th century. Approximately 20,000 Chinese lived in Siam in the 1730s and were prominent in the city of Ayutthaya and were a prominent faction within the Siamese court by 1767. 

When King Taksin, himself the son of a Chinese immigrant, ruled Thailand, King Taksin actively encouraged Chinese immigration and trade. Chinese settlers came to Siam in large numbers. Immigration continued over the following years, and the Chinese population in Thailand jumped from 230,000 in 1825 to 792,000 by 1910. By 1932, approximately 12.2 percent of the population of Thailand was Chinese.

The early Chinese immigration consisted almost entirely of men who did not bring women. Therefore, it became common for male Chinese immigrants to marry local Thai women. The children of such relationships were called Sino-Thai or luk-jin (ลูกจีน) in Thai. These Chinese-Thai intermarriages declined somewhat in the early 20th century, when significant numbers of Chinese women also began immigrating to Thailand.

Economic recession and unemployment forced many men to leave China for Thailand in search of work to seek wealth. If successful, they sent money back to their families in China. Many Chinese immigrants prospered under the "tax farming" system, whereby private individuals were sold the right to collect taxes at a price below the value of the tax revenues.

The local Chinese community had long dominated domestic commerce and had served as agents for royal trade monopolies. With the rise of European economic influence, however, many Chinese shifted to opium trafficking and tax collecting, both of which were despised occupations.

From 1882 to 1917, nearly 13,000 to 34,000 Chinese legally entered Thailand per year, mostly settling in Bangkok and along the coast of the Gulf of Siam. They predominated in occupations requiring arduous labor, skills, or entrepreneurship. They worked as blacksmiths, railroad labourers and rickshaw pullers. While most Thais were engaged in rice production, the Chinese brought new farming ideas and new methods to supply labor on its rubber plantations,  both domestically and internationally. However, republican ideas brought by the Chinese were considered seditious by the Thai government. For example, a translation of Chinese revolutionary Sun Yat-sen's Three Principles of the People was banned under the Communism Act of 1933. The government had regulated Chinese schools even before compulsory education was established in the country, starting with the Private Schools Act of 1918. This act required all foreign teachers to pass a Thai language test and for principals of all schools to implement standards set by the Thai Ministry of Education.

Legislation by King Rama VI (1910–1925) that required the adoption of Thai surnames was largely directed at the Chinese community as a number of ethnic Chinese families left Burma between 1930 and 1950 and settled in the Ratchaburi and Kanchanaburi Provinces of western Thailand. A few of the ethnic Chinese families in that area had already emigrated from Burma in the 19th century.

The Chinese in Thailand also suffered discrimination between the 1930s to 1950s under the military dictatorship of Prime Minister Plaek Phibunsongkhram (in spite of having part-Chinese ancestry himself), which allied itself with the Empire of Japan. The Primary Education Act of 1932 made the Thai language the compulsory medium of education, but as a result of protests from Thai Chinese, by 1939, students were allowed two hours per week of Mandarin instruction. State corporations took over commodities such as rice, tobacco, and petroleum and Chinese businesses found themselves subject to a range of new taxes and controls. By 1970, more than 90 percent of the Chinese born in Thailand had abandoned Chinese citizenship and were granted Thai citizenship instead. In 1975, diplomatic relations were established with China.

Culture
Intermarriage with Thais has resulted in many people who claim Thai ethnicity with Chinese ancestry. People of Chinese descent are concentrated in the coastal areas of Thailand, principally Bangkok. Considerable segments of Thailand's academic, business, and political elites are of Chinese descent.

Language

Today, nearly all ethnic Chinese in Thailand speak Thai exclusively. Only elderly Chinese immigrants still speak their native varieties of Chinese. The rapid and successful assimilation of Thai Chinese has been celebrated in contemporary literature such as "Letters from Thailand" by a Thai Chinese author Botan.
In the modern Thai language there are many signs of Chinese influence. In the 2000 census, 231,350 people identified themselves as speakers of a variant of Chinese (Teochew, Hokkien, Hainanese, Cantonese, or Hakka). The Teochew dialect has served as the language of Bangkok's influential Chinese merchants' circles since the foundation of the city in the 18th century. Although Chinese language schools were closed during the nationalist period before and during the Second World War, the Thai government never tried to suppress Chinese cultural expression. Today, businesses in Yaowarat Road and Charoen Krung Road in Bangkok's Samphanthawong District which constitute the city's "Chinatown" still feature bilingual signs in Chinese and Thai. A number of Chinese words have found their way into the Thai language, especially the names of dishes and foodstuffs, as well as basic numbers (such as those from "three" to "ten") and terms related to gambling. Chin Haw Chinese speak Southwestern Mandarin.

The rise of China's prominence on the global economic stage has prompted many Thai Chinese business families to see Mandarin as a beneficial asset in partaking in economic links and conducting business between Thailand and Mainland China, with some families encouraging their children to learn Mandarin in order to reap the benefits of their ethnic Chinese identity and the increasing role of Mandarin as a prominent language of Overseas Chinese business communities. However, equally there are many Thais, regardless of their ethnic background who study Chinese in order to boost their business and career opportunities, rather than due to reasons of ethnic identity, with some sending their children to newly established Mandarin language schools.

Rise to economic dominance

19th century

The previous official of the British Raj government as well as colonial agent named John Crawfurd used detailed records kept from 1815 to 1824 to analyze the productivity of the 8,595 Chinese resident there vis-a-vis other ethnic groups. Astonished by their competence, he concluded that the Chinese population, about five-sixths of whom were unmarried men in the prime of life, "in point of effective labour, may be measured as equivalent to an ordinary population of above 37,000, and...to a numerical Malay population of more than 80,000!".

By 1879, Chinese merchants controlled all steam-powered rice mills in Thailand. Most of the leading businessmen in Thailand were of Chinese extraction and accounted for a significant portion of Thailand's upper class. In 1890, despite British shipping dominance in Bangkok, Chinese businesses oversaw 62 percent of the shipping sector and served as agents for Western shipping firms as well as their own. They also dominated the rubber industry, market gardening, sugar production, and fish exporting sectors. In Bangkok, Thai Chinese dominated the entertainment and media industries, being the pioneers of Thailand's early publishing houses, newspapers, and film studios. Thai Chinese moneylenders wielded considerable economic power over the poorer indigenous Thai peasants, prompting accusations of Chinese bribery of government officials, wars between the Chinese secret societies, and the use of violent tactics to collect taxes. Chinese success served to foster Thai resentment against the Chinese at a time when their community was expanding rapidly. Waves of Han Chinese immigration swept into Siam in the 19th and early-20th centuries, peaking in the 1920s. Whereas Chinese bankers were accused of plunging the Thai peasant into poverty by charging high interest rates, the reality was that the Thai banking business was highly competitive. Chinese millers and rice traders were blamed for the economic recession that gripped Siam for nearly a decade after 1905. By the end of the nineteenth century, the Chinese would lose control of foreign trade to the European colonial powers, but served as compradores for Western trading houses. Ethnic Chinese then moved into extractive industries—tin mining, logging and sawmilling, rice milling, as well as building ports and railways. While acknowledged for their industriousness, the Chinese in Thailand were scorned by many. In the late 19th century, a British official in Siam said that "the Chinese are the Jews of Siam ... by judicious use of their business faculties and their powers of combination, they hold the Siamese in the palm of their hand".

20th century
By the early 20th century, the resident Chinese community in Bangkok was sizable, consisting of perhaps a third of the capital's population. Anti-Chinese sentiment was rife. In 1914, the Thai nationalist King Vajiravudh (Rama VI), published a pamphlet in Thai and English—The Jews of the East— employing a pseudonym. In it, he lambasted the Chinese. He described them as "avaricious barbarians who were 'entirely devoid of morals and mercy'".  He depicted successful Chinese businessmen as gaining their success at the expense of indigenous Thais, prompting some Thai politicians to blame Thai Chinese businessmen for Thailand's economic difficulties. King Vajiravudh's views were influential among elite Thais and were quickly adopted by ordinary Thais, fueling their suspicion of and hostility to the Chinese minority. Wealth disparity and the poverty of native Thais resulted in blaming their socioeconomic ills on the Chinese, especially Chinese moneylenders. Beginning in the late-1930s and recommencing in the 1950s, the Thai government dealt with wealth disparities by pursuing a campaign of forced assimilation achieved through property confiscation, forced expropriation, coercive social policies, and anti-Chinese cultural suppression, seeking to eradicate ethnic Han Chinese consciousness and identity. Thai Chinese became the targets of state discrimination while indigenous Thais were granted economic privileges. The Siamese revolution of 1932 only tightened the grip of Thai nationalism, culminating in World War II when Thailand's Japanese ally was at war with China.

After 1947 coup d'état, Thailand was an agrarian economy hobbled by state-owned enterprises. The Chinese provided the impetus for Thailand's industrialization, transforming the Thai economy into an export-oriented, trade-based economy with global reach. Over the next several decades, internationalization and capitalist market-oriented policies led to the emergence of a manufacturing sector, which in turn catapulted Thailand into a Tiger Cub economy. Virtually all manufacturing and import-export firms were Chinese controlled. Despite their small numbers, the Chinese controlled virtually every line of business, from small retail trade to large industries. A mere ten percent of the population, ethnic Chinese dominate over four-fifths of the country's rice, tin, rubber, and timber exports, and virtually the country's entire wholesale and retail trade. Virtually all new manufacturing establishments were Chinese controlled. Despite failed Thai affirmative action-based policies in the 1930s to economically empower the indigenous Thai majority, 70 percent of retail outlets and 80–90 percent of rice mills were controlled by ethnic Chinese. A survey of Thailand's roughly seventy most powerful business groups found that all but three were owned by Thai Chinese. Bangkok's Thai Chinese clan associations rose to prominence throughout the city as the clans are major property holders. The Chinese control more than 80 percent of public companies listed on the Stock Exchange of Thailand. All the residential and commercial land in central Siam was owned by Thai Chinese. Fifty ethnic Chinese families controlled the country's entire business sectors equivalent to 81–90 percent of the overall market capitalization of the Thai economy. Highly publicized profiles of wealthy Chinese entrepreneurs attracted great public interest and were used to illustrate the community's economic clout. More than 80 percent of the top 40 richest people in Thailand are Thai of full or partial Chinese descent. Thai Chinese entrepreneurs are influential in real estate, agriculture, banking, and finance, and the wholesale trading industries. In the 1990s, among the top ten Thai businesses in terms of sales, nine of them were Chinese-owned with only Siam Cement not being a Chinese-owned firm. Of the five billionaires in Thailand in the late-20th century, all were ethnic Chinese or of partial Chinese descent. On 17 March 2012, Chaleo Yoovidhya, of Chinese origin, died while listed on Forbes list of billionaires as 205th in the world and third in the nation, with an estimated net worth of US$5 billion.

By the late-1950s, ethnic Chinese comprised 70 percent of Bangkok's business owners and senior business managers, and 90 percent of the shares in Thai corporations were said to be held by Thais of Chinese extraction. Ninety percent of Thailand's industrial and commercial capital are also held by ethnic Chinese. Ninety percent of all investments in the industry and commercial sector and at least 50 percent of all investments in the banking and finance sectors is controlled by ethnic Chinese. Economic advantages would also persist as Thai Chinese controlled 80–90 percent of the rice mills, the largest enterprises in the nation. Thailand's lack of an indigenous Thai commercial culture led to the private sector being dominated entirely by Thai Chinese themselves. Of the 25 leading entrepreneurs in the Thai business sector, 23 are ethnic Chinese or of partial Chinese descent. Thai Chinese also comprise 96 percent of Thailand's 70 most powerful business groups. Family firms are extremely common in the Thai business sector as they are passed down from one generation to the next. Ninety percent of Thailand's manufacturing sector and 50 percent of Thailand's service sector is controlled by ethnic Chinese. According to a Financial Statistics of the 500 Largest Public Companies in Asia Controlled by Overseas Chinese in 1994 chart released by Singaporean geographer Dr. Henry Yeung of the National University of Singapore, 39 companies were concentrated in Thailand with a market capitalization of US$35 billion and total assets of US$94 billion. In Thailand, ethnic Chinese control the nation's largest private banks: Bangkok Bank, Thai Farmers Bank, Bank of Ayudhya.  Thai Chinese businesses are part of the larger bamboo network, a network of Overseas Chinese businesses operating in the markets of Southeast Asia that share common family, ethnic, language, and cultural ties. Following the 1997 Asian financial crisis, structural reforms imposed by the International Monetary Fund (IMF) on Indonesia and Thailand led to the loss of many monopolistic positions long held by the ethnic Chinese business elite. Despite the financial and economic crisis, Thai Chinese are estimated to own 65 percent of the total banking assets, 60 percent of the national trade, 90 percent of all local investments in the commercial sector, 90 percent of all local investments in the manufacturing sector, and 50 percent of all local investments in the banking and financial services sector.

21st century
The early-21st century saw Thai Chinese dominate Thai commerce at every level of society. Their economic clout plays a critical role in maintaining the country's economic vitality and prosperity. The economic power of the Thai Chinese is far greater than their proportion of the population would suggest. With their powerful economic presence, the Chinese dominate the country's wealthy elite. Development policies imposed by the Thai government provided business opportunities for the ethnic Chinese. A distinct Sino-Thai business community has emerged as the dominant economic group, controlling virtually all the major business sectors across the country. The modern Thai business sector is highly dependent on ethnic Chinese entrepreneurs and investors who control virtually all the country's banks and large conglomerates; their support is enhanced by the presence of lawmakers and politicians who are of at least part-Chinese descent. The Thai Chinese, a disproportionate wealthy, market-dominant minority not only form a distinct ethnic community, they also form, by and large, an economically advantaged social class.

With the rise of China as a global economic power, Thai-Chinese businesses have become the foremost, largest investors in Mainland China among all overseas Chinese communities worldwide. Many Thai Chinese have sent their children to newly established Chinese language schools, visit China in record numbers, invest in China, and assume Chinese surnames. The Charoen Pokphand (CP Group), a prominent Thai conglomerate founded by the Thai-Chinese Chearavanont family, has been the single largest foreign investor in China. CP Group also owns and operates Tesco Lotus, one of the largest foreign hypermarkets, 74 stores and seven distribution centers in 30 cities across China.

According to Thai historian, Dr. Wasana Wongsurawat, the Thai elite has remained in power by employing a simple two-part strategy: first, secure the economic base by cultivating the support of the Thai-Chinese business elites; second, align with the dominant world power of the day. , increasingly, that power is China.

 Religion 

First-generation Chinese immigrants were followers of Mahayana Buddhism, Confucianism and Taoism. Theravada Buddhism has since become the religion of many ethnic Chinese in Thailand, especially among assimilated Chinese. Many Chinese in Thailand commonly combine certain practices of Chinese folk religion with Theravada Buddhism due to the openness and tolerance of Buddhism. Major Chinese festivals such as Chinese New Year, Mid-Autumn Festival and Qingming are widely celebrated, especially in Bangkok, Phuket, and other parts of Thailand where there are large Chinese populations. There are several prominent Buddhist monks with Chinese ancestry like the well-known Buddhist reformer, Buddhadasa Bhikkhu and the former abbot of Wat Saket, Somdet Kiaw.

The Peranakans in Phuket are noted for their nine-day vegetarian festival between September and October. During the festival period, devotees will abstain from meat and the Chinese mediums will perform mortification of the flesh to exhibit the power of the Deities, and the rites and rituals seen are devoted to the veneration of various Deities. Such idiosyncratic traditions were developed during the 19th century in Phuket by the local Chinese with influences from Thai culture.

In the north, there is a small minority of Chinese Muslims known as Chin Ho. They are mainly the descendants of Hui people migrated from Yunnan, China. There are seven Chinese mosques in Chiang Mai. The best known is the Ban Ho Mosque.

 Dialect groups 

The vast majority of Thai Chinese belong to various southern Chinese dialect groups. Of these, 56 percent are Teochew (also commonly spelled as Teochiu), 18 percent Hakka and 11 percent Hainanese. The Cantonese, Fuzhounese, Henghua and Hokkien each constitute eight percent of the Chinese population and three percent belong to other Chinese dialect groups. A large number of Thai Chinese are the descendants of intermarriages between Chinese immigrants and Thais, while there are others who are of predominantly or solely of Chinese descent. People who are of mainly Chinese descent are descendants of immigrants who relocated to Thailand as well as other parts of Nanyang (the Chinese term for Southeast Asia used at the time) in the early to mid-20th century due to famine and civil war in the southern Chinese provinces of Guangdong (Teochew, Cantonese and Hakka groups), Hainan (Hainanese), Guangxi (Cantonese group) and Fujian (Hokkien, Hockchew and Henghua groups).

Teochew
Traditionally, the Teochews comprise a majority population of coastal provinces like Bangkok, Chonburi and Chachoengsao until the 1950s, in which later it was overwhelmed by Central Thai internal immigrants. Many of Thai military commanders as well as politicians come from Teochew backgrounds, while others were involved in trade. During the reign of King Taksin, some influential Teochew traders were granted certain privileges. These prominent traders were called "royal Chinese" (Jin-luang or จีนหลวง in Thai).

Hakka
Hakkas are mainly concentrated in Chiang Mai, Phuket and central western provinces. The Hakka own many private banks in Thailand, notably Kasikorn Bank and Kiatnakin Bank.

Cantonese
The Cantonese predominantly came from Taishan as well as Xinhui counties in Jiangmen as well as the city of Guangzhou in Guangdong province of China. This group are not very prominent and are mainly concentrated in Bangkok and the central provinces. Although Cantonese from Yulin primarily live in Betong of Yala Province they are more popularly known as Kwongsai in which they are distinguised from the fellow kinsmen from Guangdong province despite sharing the same native dialect (廣西; literally: Western Canton).

Hokkien
Hokkiens or Hoklos are a dominant group of Chinese particularly in the south of Thailand, mostly can trace their ancestry from Xiamen; aside from Thais, they also traded with Indians and other foreigners in Thailand. Hokkiens primarily live in Bandon in Surat Thani Province. A smaller Hoklo community can also be found in Hatyai in Songkhla Province. Some Hokkiens live in Bangkok traces their ancestry from Zhangzhou, like Aiyawatt Srivaddhanaprabha.

Hainanese
Hainanese people is another prominent Thai Chinese group which are mainly concentrated in Bangkok, Samui and some central provinces. Notable Hainanese Thai families include the Chirathivat family of Central Group and the Yoovidhya family of Krating Daeng, while politicians from this dialect group include Boonchu Rojanastien, Pote Sarasin, Banyat Bantadtan, Jurin Laksanawisit and Sondhi Limthongkul.

Fuzhou, Fuqing, and Hockchew dialects
This dialect group is the smallest among the ethnic Chinese populace and are found in places such as Chandi located in Nakhon Si Thammarat province as well as in other provinces such as Chumphon (Lamae and Map Ammarit villages) and also Rayong province (in the settlement of Ban Chandi, which was renamed after their main population centre of Chandi in Southern Thailand as a result of internal immigration and resettlement) as well as a lesser extent a pocket of them being internal migrants residing in Bangkok as well as Central Thailand (surrounding provinces of the capital, Bangkok), they trace their ancestries back to Fuzhou and Ningde towns of northern Fujian province, China.

Peranakan
Some ethnic Chinese living in the Malay-dominated provinces in the far south use Malay, rather than Thai as a lingua franca, and many have intermarried with local Malays, and are known as Peranakan. They are mostly concentrated in Phuket, Trang and Phang Nga Provinces.

 Family names 
Almost all Thai-Chinese or Sino-Thais, especially those who came to Thailand before the 1950s, only use Thai surname in public, while it was required by Rama VI as a condition of Thai citizenship. The few retaining native Chinese surnames are either recent immigrants or resident aliens. For some immigrants who settled in Southern Thailand before the 1950s, it was common to simply prefix Sae- (from Chinese: , 'family name') to a transliteration of their name to form the new family name; Wanlop Saechio's last name thus derived from the Hainanese  and Chanin Sae-ear's last name is from Hokkien . Sae is also used by Hmong people in Thailand. In 1950s-1970s Chinese immigrants had that surname in Thailand, although Chinese immigrants to Thailand after the 1970s use their Chinese family names without Sae- therefore these people didn't recognize as Sino-Thais like Thai celebrity, Thassapak Hsu's last name is Mandarin's surname .

Sino-Thai surnames are often distinct from those of the other-Thai population, with generally longer names mimicking those of high officials and upper-class Thais and with elements of these longer names retaining their original Chinese family name in translation or transliteration. For example, former Prime Minister Banharn Silpa-Archa's unusual Archa element is a translation into Thai of his family's former name Ma (trad. 馬, simp. 马, lit. 'horse'). Similarly, the Lim in Sondhi Limthongkul's name is the Hainanese pronunciation of the name Lin (林). For an example, see the background of the Vejjajiva Palace name. Note that the latter-day Royal Thai General System of Transcription would transcribe it as Wetchachiwa and that the Sanskrit-derived name refers to 'medical profession'.

Notable figures
Royalty

King Taksin of Thonburi - son of a Teochew Chinese father migrant gambler or trader and a Thai mother
King Rama I - "a beautiful daughter of a mix of Chinese and Thai family in Ayutthaya"
Indrasakdi Sachi, Princess consort of Siam
Queen Suthida, Queen consort of Thailand

Prime Ministers

Thai Chinese Prime Ministers: 
20th century
Kon Hutasingha, Phot Phahonyothin, Plaek Phibunsongkhram, Seni Pramoj, Pridi Banomyong, Thawan Thamrongnawasawat, Pote Sarasin, Thanom Kittikachorn, Sarit Thanarat, Kukrit Pramoj, Thanin Kraivichien, Kriangsak Chamanan, Chatichai Choonhavan, Anand Panyarachun, Suchinda Kraprayoon, Chuan Leekpai, Banharn Silpa-archa, Chavalit Yongchaiyudh,

21st century
Thaksin Shinawatra, Samak Sundaravej., Yingluck Shinawatra, Abhisit Vejjajiva, Prayut Chan-o-cha.

Cabinet and governors
Boonchu Rojanastien, Banker, Deputy Prime Minister, Finance Minister.
Chitchai Wannasathit, Minister of Justice, Acting Prime Minister.
Pao Sarasin, Deputy Prime Minister and Interior Minister.
Chavarat Charnvirakul, Acting Prime Minister of Thailand, Deputy Prime Minister, Minister of Social Development, Human Security and Interior Minister.
Bhichai Rattakul, World President of Rotary International, Deputy Prime Minister, Thailand National Assembly speaker, Minister of Foreign Affairs.
Kalaya Sophonpanich, Minister of Science and Technology.
Bhichit Rattakul, Governor of Bangkok and Businessman.
Kanchana Silpa-archa, Deputy Minister of the Ministry of Education.
Apirak Kosayodhin, Governor of Bangkok, CEO of True Corporation.
Varawut Silpa-archa, Minister of Natural Resources and Environment.
Anutin Charnvirakul, Deputy Prime Minister and Minister of Public Health.

Business and entrepreneur
Chin Sophonpanich, Banker that founded the Bangkok Bank and Bangkok Insurance.
Chaleo Yoovidhya, Billionaire inventor of Red Bull.
Vanich Chaiyawan, Billionaire and chairman of Thai Life Insurance, the second-largest life insurer in Thailand.
Prasert Prasarttong-Osoth, founder and owner of Bangkok Dusit Medical Services, Thailand's largest private health care group, and the owner of Bangkok Airways.
Dhanin Chearavanont, Billionaire and the senior chairman of CP Group.
Charoen Sirivadhanabhakdi, Billionaire business magnate and investor.
Krit Ratanarak, Billionaire chairman of Bangkok Broadcasting & Television Company.
Chalerm Yoovidhya, Billionaire Businessman and heir to the Red Bull fortune.
Vichai Srivaddhanaprabha, Billionaire  founder, owner and chairman of King Power.
Chartsiri Sophonpanich, Billionaire President of Bangkok Bank.
Panthongtae Shinawatra, founding Billionaire of Voice TV.
Aiyawatt Srivaddhanaprabha, youngest Billionaire of Asia.

Others

Atthaya Thitikul, professional golfer
Chang and Eng Bunker, famous conjoined twins.
Bundit Ungrangsee, symphonic conductor.
Apichatpong Weerasethakul, award-winning film director.
Buddhadasa Bhikkhu, famous and influential Buddhist reformist monk.
Piyabutr Saengkanokkul, academic and politician. He served as a member of the Thai House of Representatives.
Parit Wacharasindhu, politician and television host.
Joey Boy, hip hop singer and producer.
Puttichai Kasetsin, actor, DJ, television host. 
Tanutchai Wijitwongthong, actor.
Chalida Vijitvongthong, actress.
Utt Panichkul, actor, host, television presenter.
Nichkhun, singer rapper.
James Ma, actor and model.
Ten, singer and dancer.
BamBam, Boy Band rapper, record producer

 See also 

 Kian Un Keng Shrine (建安宮)
 Wat Mangkon Kamalawat (龍蓮寺)
 Wat Bamphen Chin Phrot (永福寺)
 Leng Buai Ia Shrine (龍尾古廟)
 Gong Wu Shrine
 San Chaopho Suea (Sao Chingcha) (打惱路玄天上帝廟)
 Wat San Chao Chet (七聖媽廟)
 Chao Mae Thapthim Shrine (水尾聖娘廟)
 Thian Fah Foundation Hospital (天華醫院)
 Poh Teck Tung Foundation
 Lim Ko Niao (林姑娘)
 Chow Yam-nam (White Dragon King)
 China–Thailand relations
 Racism in Thailand
 Chinese folk religion in Southeast Asia
 Burmese Chinese
 Chinese Koreans
 English Americans

 Notes 

 References 

 Further reading 

 Skinner, G. William. Leadership and Power in the Chinese Community in Thailand''. Ithaca (Cornell University Press), 1958.

External links 
 Dr. Wasana Wongsurawat lectures about her book The Crown and the Capitalists; The Ethnic Chinese and the Founding of the Thai Nation, 15 January 2020 (video)
 Thai-Chinese chamber of commerce
 Thai Chinese.net (archived 25 February 2021)
  Thai Chinese.net

Associations 
 The Chinese Association in Thailand (Chong Hua)
 Teochew Association of Thailand (archived 2 November 2007)
 Hakka Association of Thailand
  Thai Hainan Trade association of Thailand (archived 22 December 2007)
 Fujian Association of Thailand (archived 21 November 2007)

Miscellaneous 
 Thai Chinese BBS (archived 14 April 2003)
 Assessment for Chinese in Thailand (archived 21 September 2005)
 Anti-Chinese Labor riot of 1924, & bottom of page, how Thai Army suppressed 1889 riot between Chinese triads Tang Kong Xi (Teochew) and Siew Li Kue (Fujian) (archived 6 January 2009)
 Why do Thais have long surnames? (archived 22 July 2012)

 
Chinese diaspora by country
China–Thailand relations
Chinese